Mino is a genus of mynas, birds in the starling family. These are the largest of the starlings and are found in tropical moist lowland forests in New Guinea and eastern neighboring islands..

Taxonomy
The members of the genus are:

The long-tailed myna was formerly considered a subspecies of the yellow-faced myna.

References

External links
 
 

 
Bird genera
 
Taxa named by René Lesson